is a Japanese attorney and former justice of the Supreme Court of Japan.

Saiguchi attended Chuo University, graduating with an LLB in 1961, and was admitted to the bar in 1966. He practiced law as head of the Saiguchi Law Office from 1970 to 2004.

Saiguchi is known as an expert on Japanese bankruptcy laws. Following the bankruptcy of Japan Airlines, he headed a five-member investigation committee to look into compliance issues at the airline.

He currently serves as advisor attorney to TMI Associates, a Tokyo law firm.

References

Supreme Court of Japan justices
1938 births
Living people

20th-century Japanese lawyers
21st-century Japanese lawyers